Jesús Guevara (born December 15, 1969) is a retired heavyweight boxer from Venezuela, who represented his native country at the 1996 Summer Olympics in Atlanta, Georgia. There he was eliminated in the first round of the men's super-heavyweight division (+ 91 kg) by Josué Blocus from France.

References
 Sports-reference

1969 births
Living people
Heavyweight boxers
Super-heavyweight boxers
Boxers at the 1996 Summer Olympics
Olympic boxers of Venezuela
Place of birth missing (living people)
Venezuelan male boxers